Exs, or EXS may refer to:

 Exsecant
 Jet2.com, a British airline